Leshyovo is a rural locality (a selo) in Kharovskoye Rural Settlement, Kharovsky District, Vologda Oblast, Russia. The population was 13 as of 2002.

Geography 
Leshyovo is located 7 km northeast of Kharovsk (the district's administrative centre) by road. Palkovskaya is the nearest rural locality.

References 

Rural localities in Kharovsky District